The governor of Maine is the head of government of Maine and the commander-in-chief of its military forces. The governor has a duty to enforce state laws, and the power to either approve or veto bills passed by the Maine Legislature, to convene the legislature at any time, and, except in cases of impeachment, to grant pardons.

There have been 71 governors of Maine since statehood, serving 75 distinct terms. Four governors served multiple non-consecutive terms (Edward Kent, John Fairfield, John W. Dana, and Burton M. Cross). The longest-serving governor was Joseph E. Brennan, who served two terms from 1979 to 1987. The shortest-serving governors were Nathaniel M. Haskell and Richard H. Vose, who each served only one day. John W. Dana also served for one day in 1844, after the incumbent governor resigned, but was later elected to the governorship. The current governor is Democrat Janet Mills, who took office on January 2, 2019.

Governors
The District of Maine, part of Massachusetts, was admitted to the Union on March 15, 1820, as the State of Maine. The Maine Constitution of 1820 originally established a gubernatorial term of one year, to begin on the first Wednesday of January; constitutional amendments expanded this to two years in 1879 and to four years in 1957. The 1957 amendment also prohibited governors from succeeding themselves after serving two terms. The constitution does not establish an office of lieutenant governor; a vacancy in the office of governor is filled by the president of the Maine Senate. Prior to an amendment in 1964, the president of the senate only acted as governor.

See also 
Gubernatorial lines of succession in the United States#Maine

Notes

References 
 General

 
 
 
 
 
 

Specific

External links

Office of the Governor of Maine

Maine
Governors